Legio I Italica ("First Italian Legion")  was a legion of the Imperial Roman army founded by emperor Nero on September 22, 66 (the date is attested by an inscription). The epithet Italica is a reference to the Italian origin of its first recruits. It was stationed at Novae, near modern-day Svishtov (Bulgaria). There are still records of the I Italica on the Danube border at the beginning of the 5th century. The emblem of the legion was a boar.

History 
In the aftermath of the Roman–Parthian War of 58–63, Emperor Nero levied the I Italica with the name phalanx Alexandri Magni ("phalanx of Alexander the Great"), for a campaign in Armenia, ad portas Caspias – to the pass of Chawar. The sources mention the peculiar fact that the original legionaries were Italics, all over six feet tall. However, since the Jewish Revolt broke out a few weeks later, the projected Armenian campaign never took place. Also, the governor of Gaul, Gaius Julius Vindex, rose in revolt in early 68 and I Italica was redirected there, arriving just in time to see the end of the revolt. In the Year of the Four Emperors (69), after the death of Nero, the legion received the name I Italica and fought for Vitellius at the second Battle of Bedriacum, where the Vitellians were defeated by forces supporting Vespasian. The new emperor sent I Italica to the province of Moesia in 70 where they encamped at Novae (modern Svishtov) which became the legion's base of operations for centuries.

The legion served on campaign during the Dacian wars of Trajan. The legion was also responsible for bridge construction over the Danube. Building activities seem to have been an area of expertise for the legion. On 3 December 1969 a Roman votive altar was found at Old Kilpatrick on the Antonine Wall dating from around 140 A.D. It has been scanned and a video produced. The inscription mentions the First Cohort of Baetasians, previously known to have been at Bar Hill, and also Julius Candidus, a centurion from I Italica.

During the reign of Marcus Aurelius, Legio I Italica was involved in the wars against the Germanic tribes that threatened to cross the Danube. After a long war, the Romans had conquered much territory on the left side of the Danube. There Marcus Aurelius had intended to form a new province under governor Aulus Julius Pompilius Piso, commander of I Italica and IV Flavia Felix, but the revolt of Avidius Cassius in the East prevented this.

In 193, the Governor of Pannonia Superior, Septimius Severus claimed the purple and moved to Italia. I Italica supported Severus, but did not move to Italy. The legion fought against Severus' rival, Pescennius Niger, besieging Byzantium together with XI Claudia, fighting at Issus. The First possibly took part in the Parthian campaign of Severus (198).

In the 3rd century, during the rule of Caracalla, the legion participated in the construction of the Limes Transalutanus, a defensive wall along the Danube, which began near Novae. Under Alexander Severus, some vexillationes of the I Italica moved to Salonae, guarding the Dalmatian coast.

Attested members

See also 

 Capidava
 List of Roman legions
 Novae

References 

 livius.org account of Legio I Italica

External links 

 Legio I Italica – reenactment group

01 Italica
66 establishments
Svishtov
Roman Dacia
Military units and formations established in the 1st century
60s establishments
60s establishments in the Roman Empire
Boars in heraldry